Dr Parinay Fuke (born 5 January 1981) is a member of Maharashtra Legislative Council, belonging to the Bharatiya Janata Party elected as Member of Legislative Council from Bhandara-Gondia Constituency and former Minister of Maharashtra State in First Fadnavis ministry.

Education and early career
Fuke attended Nagpur University for his PhD.

Fuke won Nagpur Municipal Corporation Election independently in 2007 with 4,000 margin of votes.

Political career

Positions held

Within BJP

 Vice president, Nagpur BJP 
 Corporator, Nagpur Municipal Corporation- Independent 2007

Legislative

 Member, Maharashtra Legislative Council since 5 December 2016

References

1981 births
Living people
Members of the Maharashtra Legislative Council
Politicians from Nagpur
Bharatiya Janata Party politicians from Maharashtra